The High Commissioner of India to the United Kingdom is the head of the High Commission of India to the United Kingdom. The High Commission is located at India House in London.

History

In 1919, a committee chaired by the Marquess of Crewe determined there existed the need to separate the agency work of the India Office from its other political and administrative roles, and recommended the transfer of all such work to "a High Commissioner for India or some similar Indian Governmental Representative in London." It was also felt popular opinion in India would view this as a step towards full Dominion status for India. The Government of India Act that same year upheld the recommendations of the committee, making provision for "the appointment of a High Commissioner by His Majesty by Order in Council, which might delegate to the official any of the contractual powers of the Secretary of State [for India] in Council, and prescribe the conditions under which he should act on behalf of the Government of India or any Provincial Government."

On 13 August 1920, King-Emperor George V issued the required Order in Council. Until India became independent in 1947, the post was styled High Commission for India. The first High Commissioner for India was Indian Civil Service officer Sir William Stevenson Meyer; the first of Indian origin was Sir Dadiba Merwanji Dalal. The High Commissioner enjoyed the same status as his counterparts from the British Dominions. Upon Indian independence, the post was given the present designation.

High Commissioners for British India (1920–1947)

List of High Commissioner for British India

High Commissioners of India to the United Kingdom (1947–present)

List of former High Commissioners

Dominion of India (1947-1950)

List of former High Commissioners

Republic of India (1950-present)

References

 
India and the Commonwealth of Nations
United Kingdom and the Commonwealth of Nations
United Kingdom
India